Protodeltote inexpectata is a species of moth of the family Noctuidae first described by Ueda in 1984. It is found in Japan.

The length of the forewings is 10–12 mm.

References

Moths described in 1984
Acontiinae
Moths of Japan